The Frauen DFB-Pokal 1993–94 was the 14th season of the cup competition, Germany's second-most important title in women's football. In the final which was held in Berlin on 14 May 1994 Grün-Weiß Brauweiler met TSV Siegen just as in the previous season. This time Brauweiler won 2–1, thus winning their second cup title. In a reissue of the cup final four weeks later Siegen defeated Brauweiler 1–0 in the final of championship.

First round 

Several clubs had byes in the first round. Those clubs were automatically qualified for the 2nd round of the cup. For reasons unknown TuS Wörrstadt and FC Rumeln-Kaldenhausen chose not to attend.  The first round was held from 7 July to 11 August 1993.

Second round 

The second round was held on 28–29 August 1993.

Third round 

The third round was held on 7 November 1993.

Quarter-finals 

The quarter-finals were held on 28 November 1993 and 13 February 1994.

Semi-finals

The semi-finals were held on 20 April 1994.

Final

See also 
 Bundesliga 1993–94
 1993–94 DFB-Pokal men's competition

References 

DFB-Pokal Frauen seasons
Pokal
Fra